Notasulga is a town in Lee and Macon counties in the U.S. state of Alabama. As of the 2020 census, the population of the town was 914. The portion in Lee County is part of the Auburn Metropolitan Area. According to the 1910 U.S. Census, it incorporated in 1893. Author Zora Neale Hurston was born in Notasulga in 1891. The town name comes from the Creek words noti sulgi, which means "many teeth".

Geography
Notasulga is located in northern Macon County at  (32.560821, -85.667631). The town extends northeast into the western part of Lee County.

The center of town is on a height of land, draining north to Sougahatchee Creek, a west-flowing tributary of the Tallapoosa River, and south to Red Creek, a tributary of Uphapee Creek, which also flows west to the Tallapoosa.

Demographics

As of the census of 2000, there were 916 people, 393 households, and 260 families residing in the town. The racial makeup of the town was 66.27% White, 32.42% Black or African American, 0.22% Native American, 0.55% from other races, and 0.55% from two or more races. 0.76% of the population were Hispanic or Latino of any race.

There were 393 households, out of which 26.2% had children under the age of 18 living with them, 48.6% were married couples living together, 14.0% had a female householder with no husband present, and 33.6% were non-families. 29.5% of all households were made up of individuals, and 11.5% had someone living alone who was 65 years of age or older. The average household size was 2.33 and the average family size was 2.87.

In the town, the population was spread out, with 23.4% under the age of 18, 7.8% from 18 to 24, 24.8% from 25 to 44, 28.2% from 45 to 64, and 15.9% who were 65 years of age or older. The median age was 40 years. For every 100 females, there were 86.6 males. For every 100 females age 18 and over, there were 81.9 males.

The median income for a household in the town was $31,307, and the median income for a family was $34,479. Males had a median income of $27,500 versus $18,684 for females. The per capita income for the town was $17,115. About 10.7% of families and 17.8% of the population were below the poverty line, including 20.8% of those under age 18 and 11.2% of those age 65 or over.

Government
Notasulga elects a mayor and five city council members every four years.

2017 Mayor and Council:
Mayor - Tommy Miller
Council District 1 - Cecil R. Langford, Jr.
Council District 2 - Denise Pilato
Council District 3 - Cline Carmack
Council District 4 - Scott Barnhart
Council District 5 - Robin Collins
Police Chief - Erik Richardson 
Fire Chief - Michael Whitman
Utilities Superintendent - Tony McCarty

Notable people
Valerie Boyd, journalist, author and cultural critic
Pat Dye, former American football player, coach, and college athletics administrator. He served as the head football coach at East Carolina University (1974–1979), the University of Wyoming (1980), and Auburn University (1981–1992) compiling a career college football record of 153–62–5. He served as the athletic director at Auburn from 1981 to 1991 and was inducted into the College Football Hall of Fame as a coach in 2005.
John K. Hodnette, electrical engineer at the Westinghouse Electric Corporation who was awarded the IEEE Edison Medal in 1957
Zora Neale Hurston, anthropologist, novelist
J. Ed Livingston, jurist and the twenty-third Chief Justice of the Alabama Supreme Court from 1951 through 1971
Gerald Robinson, former National Football League defensive end who played from 1986 to 1994 for the Minnesota Vikings, the San Diego Chargers and the Los Angeles Rams. He attended the Auburn University, is the all-time sack leader at Auburn University.

Gallery

References

Towns in Lee County, Alabama
Towns in Macon County, Alabama
Towns in Alabama
Columbus metropolitan area, Georgia
Auburn metropolitan area, Alabama
Alabama placenames of Native American origin